The 2023 Yobe State House of Assembly election will take place on 11 March 2023, to elect members of the Yobe State House of Assembly. The election will be held concurrent with the state gubernatorial election as well as twenty-seven other gubernatorial elections and elections to all other state houses of assembly. It will be held two weeks after the presidential election and National Assembly elections.

Electoral system
The members of state Houses of Assembly are elected using first-past-the-post voting in single-member constituencies.

Background
In the previous House of Assembly elections, the APC won a sizeable majority that elected Ahmed Lawan Mirwa (APC-Nguru II) as Speaker. In other Yobe elections, incumbent APC Governor Mai Mala Buni won in a landslide as the APC swept every House of Representatives and Senate seat along with Buhari winning the state in a landslide.

Overview

Summary

Notes

See also 
 2023 Nigerian elections
 2023 Nigerian House of Assembly elections

References 

House of Assembly
2023
Yobe